Gamal Awad (9 August 1955 – 6 November 2004) was a squash player from Egypt. 
He was the younger brother of Mohammed Awad another notable Egyptian squash player. Awad became the Egyptian national champion in 1976, and won the British Amateur championship in 1977 and 1978. He finished runner-up to Jahangir Khan at both the 1982 World Masters and the 1983 British Open.

The match for which Awad is best remembered came at the Chichester Open in 1983 against Jahangir, which set a new world record for the longest squash match on record. The first game itself was a record for the longest single game in a squash match, as Awad recovered from 1–8 down to take the game 10–9 in 1 hour and 11 minutes. In the end, Jahangir won the match 9–10, 9–5, 9–7, 9–2 in 2 hours and 46 minutes.

Awad's acrobatic performances on the squash court earned him the nicknames "rubber man" and "grasshopper".

Awad retired from the professional squash circuit in 1987, following problems with knee injuries.

Gamal Awad died of a heart attack on 6 November 2004 in Alexandria at the age of 49.

References

External links
 Article at Squashtalk.com
 Article at Squashplayer.co.uk
 

1955 births
2004 deaths
Egyptian male squash players
20th-century Egyptian people